In differential geometry, the integration along fibers of a k-form yields a -form where m is the dimension of the fiber, via "integration". It is also called the fiber integration.

Definition 
Let  be a fiber bundle over a manifold with compact oriented fibers. If  is a k-form on E, then for tangent vectors wi's at b, let

 

(To see  is smooth, work it out in coordinates; cf. an example below.)

Then  is a linear map . By Stokes' formula, if the fibers have no boundaries(i.e.  ), the map descends to de Rham cohomology:

This is also called the fiber integration.

Now, suppose  is a sphere bundle; i.e., the typical fiber is a sphere. Then there is an exact sequence , K the kernel,
which leads to a long exact sequence, dropping the coefficient  and using :
,
called the Gysin sequence.

Example 
Let  be an obvious projection. First assume  with coordinates  and consider a k-form:

Then, at each point in M,

From this local calculation, the next formula follows easily (see Poincaré_lemma#Direct_proof): if  is any k-form on 

As an application of this formula, let  be a smooth map (thought of as a homotopy). Then the composition  is a homotopy operator (also called a chain homotopy):

which implies  induce the same map on cohomology, the fact known as the homotopy invariance of de Rham cohomology. As a corollary, for example, let U be an open ball in Rn with center at the origin and let . Then , the fact known as the Poincaré lemma.

Projection formula 
Given a vector bundle π : E → B over a manifold, we say a differential form α on E has vertical-compact support if the restriction  has compact support for each b in B. We write  for the vector space of differential forms on E with vertical-compact support.
If E is oriented as a vector bundle, exactly as before, we can define the integration along the fiber:

The following is known as the projection formula. We make  a right -module by setting .

Proof: 1. Since the assertion is local, we can assume π is trivial: i.e.,  is a projection. Let  be the coordinates on the fiber. If , then, since  is a ring homomorphism,

Similarly, both sides are zero if α does not contain dt. The proof of 2. is similar.

See also 
Transgression map

Notes

References 
Michele Audin, Torus actions on symplectic manifolds, Birkhauser, 2004

Differential geometry